The year 2016 is the 235th year of the Rattanakosin Kingdom of Thailand. It was the 71st and last year in the reign of King Bhumibol Adulyadej (Rama IX), the first year in the reign of King Vajiralongkorn (Rama X). It is reckoned as year 2559 in the Buddhist Era.

Incumbents
 King:
 until 13 October : Bhumibol Adulyadej 
 starting 13 October : Vajiralongkorn
 Crown Prince: 
 until 13 October : Vajiralongkorn
 Prime Minister: Prayut Chan-o-cha
Supreme Patriarch: (vacant)

Events

January
 January 29 – the CC published drafting a new constitution and forwarded it to the NRC for approval.

February

March

April

May

June
 June 9 – 70th Anniversary Celebrations of Bhumibol Adulyadej's Accession.

July

August

September

October
 October 13 – King Bhumibol Adulyadej dies at Siriraj Hospital in Bangkok the age of 88 after 70 years of reign. One year period of mourning was declared the following day. His only son, Crown Prince Maha Vajiralongkorn, became Thailand's new monarch.

November

December

Births

Deaths

See also
 2016 in Thai television
 List of Thai films of 2016

References

External links

 
Thailand
Years of the 21st century in Thailand
Thailand
2010s in Thailand